Western Reserve Rowing Association, also known as WRRA is based out of Rivergate Park on the Cuyahoga River in Cleveland, Ohio, United States.

WRRA organizes all sweep and sculling for adults in Northeast Ohio. It offers athletes the opportunity to train and race in regattas all over North America through its Competitive Team, and fosters camaraderie, fitness and technique with its Recreational Program. It organizes Summer Rowing League, Learn to Row and the Sculling Program. WRRA currently serves over 500 adult rowers.

WRRA partners with the Cleveland Rowing Foundation to organize the Head of the Cuyahoga every fall.

See also
 Sport rowing
 Rowing exercise

External links
 Official website
 Cleveland Rowing Foundation

Rowing clubs in the United States
Sports in Cleveland